In the sole edition of the tournament, Mihnea-Ion Năstase and Goran Prpić won the title by defeating Ola Jonsson and Fredrik Nilsson 3–6, 7–5, 6–3 in the final.

Seeds

Draw

Draw

References

External links
 Official results archive (ATP)
 Official results archive (ITF)

Singles